Daniel Brenner could refer to:

Daniel Brenner, American Rabbi
Dan Brenner (born 1963), American musician